Gokulchandra Nag (  28 June 1894  -  24 September 1925), was a Bengali writer and artist, best known as one of the founding members of the Kallol literary group and circle during early twentieth century Bengal' His elder brother Kalidas Nag was a distinguished historian and academician.

Career 
In 1921 along with Dineshranjan Das, Sunita Debi and Manindralal Basu he formed the predecessor of Kallol, "The Four Arts Club". He was adept at all of the four arts that the club propagated, namely, writing, painting, music, and drama. Along with his cultural practices he ran a florist's shop in New Market, Calcutta. He published stories in Jhorer Dola (The Sway of the Storm) published in 1922. The volume was an anthology of the stories of the four founding members of the club.

In 1923, Nag and Das founded the Kallol group. The literary discussions of the group would be held at Das' house at Patuatola Lane.

Notes

1890s births
1925 deaths
Bengali writers
University of Calcutta alumni
Bengali-language writers
Writers from West Bengal
20th-century Bengalis
Bengali Hindus
Bengali poets
People from Howrah
People from Darjeeling
People from Darjeeling district
West Bengal academics
Indian editors
Indian magazine editors
Indian artists
Indian male artists
Indian painters
Indian male painters
Indian male writers
Indian poets
Indian male poets
20th-century Indian writers
20th-century Indian male writers
20th-century Indian poets
20th-century Indian artists
Bengali artists
Bengali male artists
20th-century Indian painters